Gilbert Scodeller (10 June 1931 – 13 April 1989) was a French professional racing cyclist. He rode in three editions of the Tour de France. He also finished in fourth place in the 1955 Paris–Roubaix.

References

External links
 

1931 births
1989 deaths
French male cyclists
Sportspeople from Pas-de-Calais
Cyclists from Hauts-de-France
20th-century French people